Singulisphaera acidiphila is an aerobic and non-motile bacterium from the genus of Singulisphaera which has been isolated from Sphagnum peat from the Yaroslavl Region in Russia.

References

Bacteria described in 2008